Nicholas Bateman (born 1967), also known as "Nasty Nick", is a British media personality and a contestant on the first series of the British version of Big Brother.

Early life
Nick Bateman grew up in Kent. He worked in the City of London as a broker before taking part in Big Brother.

Big Brother
Bateman first came to public prominence as a contestant on the first series of the UK version of Big Brother. He was one of 40,000 people that applied to be in the first series of Big Brother in the United Kingdom in 2000. During his stay at the Big Brother house, he was the only contestant never to receive a single eviction nomination. However, he was soon dubbed "Nasty Nick" by the tabloid press because of his duplicitous nature, playing members off against one another. After 34 days he was finally exposed by the other housemates after being tipped off by producers, who confronted him over his behaviour and also uncovered his attempts to manipulate fellow housemates' votes in the weekly eviction process, in violation of Big Brother rules. He was asked to leave by the show's producers.

After Big Brother
After his departure from the show, Bateman enjoyed media exposure. He went on to present the television show Trust Me. He co-wrote a book entitled Nasty Bateman: How to be a Right Bastard. He has also featured in the reality television series Back to Reality and in the Big Brother pantomime. Later, he featured as the narrator in a stage production of The Rocky Horror Show.

In 2010, Bateman competed in Ultimate Big Brother, the final series of Big Brother on Channel 4, and finished in fifth place. He has appeared in the Channel 5 companion show Big Brother's Bit on the Side since the 2011 Channel 5 relaunch of Big Brother. Bateman also presented a weekly radio show on 107.8 Academy FM (2011) in Kent. He has appeared in pantomime on several occasions. In 2013, he moved to Sydney, Australia.

References

External links
 UK Gameshows

1967 births
Living people
People educated at Gordonstoun
Big Brother (British TV series) contestants
People from Kent
English radio presenters
English television personalities
Place of birth missing (living people)
Big Brother (franchise) contestants